Derek Lane Holland (born October 9, 1986) nicknamed "Dutch Oven",  is an American professional baseball pitcher who is currently a free agent. He has played in Major League Baseball (MLB) for the Texas Rangers, Chicago White Sox, San Francisco Giants, Chicago Cubs, Pittsburgh Pirates, and Detroit Tigers. He is nicknamed "Dutch Oven".

Early life 
Holland was born on October 9, 1986, in Newark, Ohio, to Wendy and Rick Holland.

Professional career

Draft and minor leagues 
The Texas Rangers selected Holland in the 25th round of the 2006 MLB draft out of Wallace State Community College in Hanceville, Alabama, a member of the National Junior College Athletic Association. He was the number two rated prospect in the Rangers organization according to Baseball America, behind Neftalí Feliz, for 2009.

Texas Rangers 
On April 22, 2009, Holland made his MLB debut; pitching  innings, allowing three hits, no runs, no walks, and striking out two. On August 9, he pitched his first complete game, a 7–0 shutout against the Los Angeles Angels of Anaheim in Anaheim. For the 2009 season, Holland finished the season 8–13 with a 6.12 ERA in 33 games (21 starts). Holland spent the majority of 2010 in Triple-A Oklahoma City, and was called up only due to injuries to other starters. After winning his first two decisions, he lost his next three. He ended the regular season with a 3–4 record, and 4.08 ERA.

Holland allowed three runs in  innings in the 2010 ALDS against the Tampa Bay Rays. He pitched 5.2 innings in the 2010 ALCS with no earned runs. In Game 4, he earned the victory against the defending champion New York Yankees. He entered the game in the fourth inning with one out and the bases loaded, and got his team out of a serious jam while also eating away innings to protect his bullpen. In game 2 of the 2010 World Series, Holland entered with one on and two outs in the bottom of the 8th inning, with the Rangers trailing 2–0. Holland walked all three batters he faced without recording an out, and he forced in the runner he inherited via his final walk. Holland's wildness opened the door for what turned into a huge inning for the eventual champion Giants, as all three of the batters he walked came around to score. The Rangers lost the game 9–0.  Holland pitched a scoreless relief inning in a game four 4–0 loss, but the Rangers lost the series 4–1.

Holland started the 2011 season as a starter for the Rangers, and despite a 4.96 ERA, won four of his five starts in April and May.  He lowered his ERA to 4.14 in June, mainly by virtue of his first shutout of the season. He started off July with inconsistency, failing to make it out of the first inning against the Marlins.  Over the next five starts, he responded by throwing three more shutouts.

In 2011, he was 16–5 with a 3.95 ERA.  He led the AL in shutouts (4; tied for fifth-most in Rangers history), was 3rd in win–loss percentage (.762; the fifth-best in Rangers history), and was 4th in wins. On October 23, Holland was the winning pitcher in Game 4 of the 2011 World Series against the St. Louis Cardinals, giving up no runs on two hits, two walks and striking out seven. He was pulled from the game after pitching  innings. The Rangers lost the World Series in seven games.

Holland signed a contract extension on March 20, 2012, that was worth $28.5 million over five years with a two-year club option. Holland finished the regular season with a win–loss record of 12–7 with an ERA of 4.67 as he gave up 32 home runs, fifth highest in Major League Baseball. In 2013, Holland went 10–9 with a 3.42 ERA in 33 starts. On January 7, 2014, Holland suffered a knee injury after a fall while playing with his dog at home. Holland underwent arthroscopic microfracture surgery to repair torn cartilage in his left knee on January 10, 2014. He was placed on the 60-day disabled list and sidelined until the All-Star break.

Holland strained his subscapularis muscle during the Rangers' first home game of the 2015 season, and was placed on the 60-day disabled list on April 10.  Holland returned on August 19, 2015 to start against the Seattle Mariners. He went  innings pitched with six strikeouts and 2 earned runs as he earned his first win of the season in a 7–2 Rangers' win. On August 30, Holland threw a complete game against the Baltimore Orioles at Globe Life Park. His last complete game was on September 23, 2013. It was his eighth career shutout. He went nine innings, no walks, no runs, 11 strikeouts, and allowed only three hits, in a 6–0 win.

On November 8, 2016, the Rangers announced they would decline a 2017 club option on Holland, making him a free agent. Holland was due to receive $11 million in pay in 2017, and received a $1.5 million buyout.

Chicago White Sox
On December 14, 2016, Holland signed a one-year, $6 million contract with the Chicago White Sox. Holland began the season with a 2.37 ERA in 10 starts, but afterwards, his performance regressed immensely. He was granted an unconditional release on September 5, 2017, after a 7–14 record, 6.20 ERA and a 1.71 WHIP through 26 starts and 3 relief appearances with the White Sox.

San Francisco Giants
On February 9, 2018, Holland signed a minor league contract with the San Francisco Giants.  With injuries to Madison Bumgarner and Jeff Samardzija, Holland was added to the rotation at the beginning of the season. Throughout the season, he would make starts and also provide relief appearances from the bullpen. He finished the 2018 season with a 7–9 record and a 3.57 ERA.

On January 14, 2019, the Giants re-signed Holland to a one-year deal with a club option for 2020, earning a base salary of $6.5 million and a $500,000 buyout for 2020. Holland earned his first win of the season on April 9 against the Padres. On April 29, Holland was placed on the 10-day injured list with a bone bruise in his left index finger. Upon returning from the IL, he started against Colorado, giving up seven earned runs over  innings. In a post-game interview on May 11, Holland told the media that he "faked an injury" and questioned the Front Office's operations. Bruce Bochy and Farhan Zaidi both responded to his statement, chastising him for not approaching them first before speaking to the media and ensuring they had an open door policy when it comes to player concerns. Since his start in Colorado, Holland has been relegated to long-relief appearances out of the bullpen.

On July 21, 2019, Holland was designated for assignment.

Chicago Cubs
On July 26, 2019, the Giants traded Holland to the Chicago Cubs for cash considerations. On August 25, 2019, he was placed on the 10 day IL and sent down to the Triple-A Iowa Cubs and was replaced with David Bote. Holland became a free agent following the 2019 season.

Pittsburgh Pirates
On January 31, 2020, Holland signed a minor league contract with the Pittsburgh Pirates that included an invitation to Spring Training.

On August 8, 2020, against the Detroit Tigers, Holland allowed 5 runs on 4 home runs within his first 11 pitches of the first inning. He allowed  a total of 9 runs on 5 home runs all in 5 innings as the Pirates lost 11–5.

Detroit Tigers
On February 1, 2021, Holland signed a minor league contract with the Detroit Tigers that included an invitation to Spring Training. On March 26, Tigers manager A. J. Hinch announced that Holland had won a spot on the Tigers opening day roster as a reliever, and that the team would clear room for him on the 40-man roster. On April 1, Holland was selected to the 40-man roster. He made 39 appearances (38 in relief) for the 2021 Tigers, posting a 3–2 record with a 5.07 ERA and 51 strikeouts in  innings.

Boston Red Sox
On March 18, 2022, Holland signed a minor league deal with the Boston Red Sox. Holland was reassigned to the minor leagues on April 2, but did not exercise the opt-out clause in his contract. Holland opted out of his deal with the Red Sox on May 1, 2022.

Toronto Blue Jays
On May 4, 2022, three days after opting out of his deal with Boston, Holland signed a minor league deal with the Toronto Blue Jays. He was released on July 22, 2022.

Controversies
During a game in the 2012 season, Holland's Twitter account was used to attack another Twitter user with a slur. Holland responded to the ensuing controversy by claiming his Twitter account was hacked.

In 2018, Holland appeared in a skit on MLB Network's Intentional Talk in which he mocked Asian people by feigning a racially insensitive accent. Holland didn't agree with assertions that his actions were racist, but said he understood why people were upset. The San Francisco Giants and Holland later apologized for his actions.

In 2019, Holland verbally attacked the Giants and claimed they made him fake an injury so as to be placed on the injured list. The Giants denied the allegation.

60 feet 6 Foundation 
In 2014, Holland launched the 60 Feet 6 Foundation to help raise awareness of and fund research for leukemia, particularly its pediatric forms. Through the charity, he raises funds to help families battling the disease.

References

External links

MLB Top 50 Prospects
Derek Holland stats  at MinorLeagueBaseball.com
60 Feet 6 Foundation

1986 births
Living people
Arizona League Rangers players
Bakersfield Blaze players
Baseball players from Ohio
Buffalo Bisons (minor league) players
Chicago Cubs players
Chicago White Sox players
Clinton LumberKings players
Detroit Tigers players
Frisco RoughRiders players
Major League Baseball pitchers
Oklahoma City RedHawks players
Pittsburgh Pirates players
Round Rock Express players
San Francisco Giants players
Spokane Indians players
Sportspeople from Newark, Ohio
Texas Rangers players
Wallace State Lions baseball players
World Baseball Classic players of the United States
2013 World Baseball Classic players
Twitch (service) streamers